Diesel locomotives used on the railways of Australia.

NSWGR/SRA/FreightCorp and successors

Diesel-electric
40 class
41 class
42 class
421 class
422 class
43 class
44 class
442 class
45 class
47 class
48 class
49 class
79 class
80 class
81 class
82 class
90 class
92 class
PL class ex 48 class 
XPT

Diesel-hydraulic 
70 class
71 class
72 class
73 class
X100 & X200 class rail tractors

Commonwealth Railways/Australia National/National Rail 
AN class
DL class
BL class
NR class
AL class
BU class
CK class
CL class
DA (900) class
DE class
DR class
EL class
GM class
MDH class
NB class
NC class
NJ (1600) class
NSU class
NT class

South Australian Railways

Diesel-electric
350
500
600
700
800
830
900
930

Victorian Railways/V/Line/Freight Australia

Diesel-electric
A Class
B Class
C Class
F Class
G Class
H Class
N Class
P Class
S Class
T Class
V class
X Class
XR Class
XRB Class
Y Class

Diesel-hydraulic 
M class
V class
W class

BHP/AIS and successors

Diesel-electric
BHP Port Kembla D1 class
BHP Port Kembla D9 class
BHP Port Kembla D16 class
BHP Port Kembla D34 class
BHP Port Kembla D35 class
BHP/Austrac Port Kembla 101 class
BHP/Austrac Port Kembla 103
BHP Newcastle 32 class
BHP Newcastle 37 class
BHP Whyalla DE class (DE1, DE2)
DE3-DE9)
BHP Whyalla DE10
Lysaghts JL1 class
Lysaghts JL4 class
GE AC6000CW (imported)
Emd SD70ACe lc (imported)

Diesel-hydraulic 
BHP Whyalla DH class

Silverton Tramway

Diesel-hydraulic 
Silverton ST26

Diesel-electric
48s

Queensland Rail
Also operates on the Standard Gauge ex V/line G and X class, ex SRA 73, 421, 422, ex AN CLF and CLP class's

Diesel-electric
1150
1170
1200
1225
1250
1270
1300
1400
1450
1460
1502
1550
1600
1620
1700
1720
2100
2130
2141
2150
2170
2250
2300
2350
2370
2400
2450
2470
2600
2800
4000
4100

Diesel-mechanical 
DL class

Diesel-hydraulic 
DH class

Freightlink
FQ class
FJ class

CFCLA
GL class
RL class
VL class

See also
List of locomotives
Rail transport in Australia

 
Diesel locomotives
Railway locomotive-related lists